Stigmella rhamnella is a moth of the family Nepticulidae. It is found from Denmark to the Iberian Peninsula and Italy and from France to Romania and Ukraine. It has also been recorded from Estonia. It is not on the southern part of Balkan Peninsula.

There are two to three generations per year.

The larvae feed on Rhamnus alpinus, Rhamnus catharticus, Rhamnus pumilus and Rhamnus saxatilis. They mine the leaves of their host plant. The mine consists of a rather long corridor, suddenly turning into an elongated, full depth blotch. The corridor usually follows the leaf margin for a long distance. The frass fills most of the corridor in the first section.

External links
Fauna Europaea
bladmineerders.nl

Nepticulidae
Moths of Europe
Moths described in 1860